Cicindela arenicola is a species of tiger beetle in the genus Cicindela. It was first described in 1967. Its common names include St. Anthony Dune tiger beetle and Idaho Dunes tiger beetle.

This rare beetle species is only known from Idaho and Montana in the United States, where it lives in sand dune ecosystems. The first specimen identified in 1967 is from the sand dunes of the Snake River Valley in southern Idaho. It is most active during warm days in the spring and fall, and it retreats to burrows in the sand when conditions are very hot or cold. Adults hibernate during the winter and emerge from burrows in the spring to mate and lay eggs. It is more closely related to Cicindela theatina in habitat, morphology, and ecology than any other Cicindela species.

See also
 List of Cicindela species

Notes

References
Logan, D. R. 1995. Idaho dune tiger beetle survey 1995 (Cicindela arenicola Rumpp). United States Bureau of Land Management, Idaho State Office.

arenicola
Beetles described in 1967